Gyzylarbat (formerly Serdar and Kyzyl-Arvat or Gyzylarbat and Farāva) is a city subordinate to a district in Turkmenistan, located north-west of the capital, Ashgabat on the M37 highway to the Caspian Sea. The population of Gyzylarbat is 50,000 people, mainly Turkmen. The main language spoken in the region is Turkmen. It is near the northwest end of the line of oases on the north slope of the Kopet Dag that extends southeast to Ashgabat.

Name

"Kyzyl-Rabat" and later evolution
The 8th-9th-century fortification in this place was called Kyzyl-Rabat, "red fortress". In the 16th-17th centuries this name was corrupted in the vernacular to Kyzyl-Arbat. In 1925, during Soviet rule, a district called Kizyl-Arvat was established.

Serdar
On 29 December 1999 the town was renamed from Kizyl-Arvat to Serdar. The word serdar is a loan word from Persian meaning "leader" and is a reference to the first President of Turkmenistan, Saparmurat Niyazov. The town also shared a name with the third President of Turkmenistan, Serdar Berdimuhamedow, but had no relation. By decree of the Turkmen parliament on 9 November 2022, the old name was restored in the form Gyzylarbat. The same decree downgraded Gyzylarbat from a city with district status to a city subordinate to a district, and renamed the district to Gyzylarbat, as well.

Location
The city is located on the edge of the Karakum Desert at the foot of the Kopet-Dag ridge.

History

Persian city of Farava
In ancient times, the region was inhabited by the Dahae, an Iranian people. Gyzylarbat is at the site of the old Persian city of Farāva (Parau; فراوه in Persian). Before the immigration of the Turkmens to these regions, Farava's population was Persian.

Turkic settlement
When the Oghuz, under the command of Tughril and Chaghri, lost a battle against Sultan Mahmud of Ghazna (r. 998–1030), they made a submission to the sultan, requesting him to allow them to cross the waters of the Oxus and settle somewhere between Nisa and Abivard. Sultan Mahmud acceded to their request and allotted them the grazing grounds in the steppe near Sarakhs, Abivard and Farava.

Russian and Soviet periods
During the Russian conquest several exploring expeditions reached here, but the main fighting was at Geok Tepe – see Battle of Geok Tepe (1879) and Battle of Geok Tepe (1881). The modern city was established in 1881 with a station on the Trans-Caspian Railway.

In July 1918, following his declaration of martial law in Ashgabat, Commissar V. Frolov, head of the Tashkent Cheka, came to Kyzyl-Arvat to impose the authority of the Tashkent Soviet. However the railway workers had heard of his execution of strike leaders in Ashgabat and organised an armed response. He was shot with some of his followers and the rest were disarmed. This action opened the way to the formation of the Transcaspian Government.

On 25 June 1957, the Soviet 58th Motor Rifle Division was established in Kyzyl-Arvat, from the 58th Rifle Division which had arrived years earlier.

After independence (1991)
During the rule of President Gurbanguly Berdimuhamedov (r. 2007–2022), the city expanded to the north-west: a house of culture, a carpet factory, a secondary school, a kindergarten, an art school, a shopping center, a sports complex with a stadium, a swimming pool and playgrounds for various sports were erected. In addition, the infrastructure of the city was updated. In particular, a new railway and bus station, a flyover bridge and a collector for absorbing mudflows, sewage treatment plants, and a number of other engineering facilities were built here.

Private construction of the northern outskirts of the city is planned. Urban road infrastructure has been upgraded in recent years.

Population

Transportation
The rail station is on the Trans-Caspian railway. Construction began in 1879 of a narrow-gauge railway to Gyzylarbat in connection with the Russian conquest of Transcaspia under General Mikhail Skobelev.

Road transport includes two bus routes. Small PAZ buses serve the local population.

Climate
Gyzylarbat has a cool desert climate (Köppen climate classification BWk), with cool winters and very hot summers. Rainfall is generally light and erratic, and occurs mainly in the winter and autumn months.

References

Populated places in Balkan Region
Populated places established in 1881
1881 establishments in Asia